Furio Colombo (born 1 January 1931) is an Italian journalist and politician, former editor-in-chief of L'Unità.

Biography

Journalistic and academic career 
Colombo was born in Châtillon, Aosta Valley in a Jewish family. In the mid-1950s he started working for the Italian National Broadcasting Corporation RAI where he collaborated to the creation of cultural radio and television programs, documentaries and journalistic reportages.

In the early 1970s, Colombo taught Theory and Techniques of Media and Radio and Television Language in the newly founded Department of Art, Music and Entertainment at the University of Bologna.

In the late 1980s Colombo moved to New York where he worked as correspondent from the United States for La Stampa and for La Repubblica, of which he has been a columnist. He wrote for the New York Times and New York Review of Books and taught journalism at the Columbia University and at the University of California. From 1991 to 1994, he was the director of the Italian Cultural Institute in New York City.

From 2001 to 2005, Colombo has been editor-in-chief of the left-wing newspaper L'Unità. According to Marco Travaglio, Colombo left the paper after four years due to the opposition of personalities from the DS Party against the excessive autonomy of Colombo from the party lines.

Since 2006 Colombo has been a columnist for Il Fatto Quotidiano.

Political career 
Colombo has been elected to the Chamber of Deputies in 1996 with the Democratic Party of the Left and in 2008 with the Democratic Party, and to the Senate in 2006 with the Democrats of the Left.

After the 2008 elections, Colombo became a member of the Foreign Affairs Committee of the Chamber of Deputies. From 2011, with the death of Mirko Tremaglia, till the end of the legislature in 2013, Colombo has been the oldest Deputy of the 16th Legislature.

On 16 July 2007, with an article published on L'Unità, Colombo announced his candidacy for the Democratic Party secretariat, focusing on a strong criticism against Silvio Berlusconi, but on 1 August he gave up his candidacy, just as Antonio Di Pietro and Marco Pannella did, due to excessively bureaucratic rules in order to be able to advance his candidacy.

On 2 May 2015, in occasion of Marco Pannella's 85th birthday, Colombo joined the Transnational Radical Party.

References

External links 
Files about his parliamentary activities (in Italian): XIII, XV, XVI legislature.

1931 births
Living people
20th-century Italian politicians
21st-century Italian politicians
Democratic Party of the Left politicians
Democrats of the Left politicians
Democratic Party (Italy) politicians
Members of the Senate of the Republic (Italy)
Senators of Legislature XV of Italy
Members of the Chamber of Deputies (Italy)
Deputies of Legislature XIII of Italy
Deputies of Legislature XVI of Italy
20th-century Italian journalists
20th-century Italian Jews
21st-century Italian journalists
Italian male journalists
Italian newspaper editors
Academic staff of the University of Bologna
Columbia University faculty
University of California faculty
People from Aosta Valley
La Repubblica people
L'Unità editors
20th-century Italian male writers